Brackenborough with Little Grimsby is a civil parish in the East Lindsey district of Lincolnshire, England.

According to the 2001 census, the parish had a population of 78, including both Brackenborough and Little Grimsby. .

References

External links

Civil parishes in Lincolnshire
East Lindsey District